Schweich an der Römischen Weinstraße is a Verbandsgemeinde ("collective municipality") in the Trier-Saarburg district, in Rhineland-Palatinate, Germany. 

It is located in the northeast of Trier and consists of the town of Schweich on the Moselle and the 18 Ortsgemeinden ("local municipalities") of Bekond, Detzem, Ensch, Fell, Föhren, Kenn, Klüsserath, Köwerich, Leiwen, Longen, Longuich, Mehring, Naurath, Pölich, Riol, Schleich, Thörnich and Trittenheim.

Geography 

Neighbouring collective municipalities 
Neighboring collective municipalities are (starting clockwise in the north): 
 Verbandsgemeinde Wittlich-Land
 Verbandsgemeinde Bernkastel-Kues
 Verbandsgemeinde Thalfang am Erbeskopf
 Verbandsgemeinde Hermeskeil
 Verbandsgemeinde Ruwer
 Stadt Trier
 Verbandsgemeinde Trier-Land

Associated municipalities  
The list contains the coats of arms, the municipality names, the district areas, exemplarily the population figures from 1950 as well as the current population figures.

History 
The Verbandsgemeinde Schweich was created by the state law amending municipal constitutional regulations and preparing the reorganization of the municipalities of July 16, 1968, which determined the reorganization of the previous offices into Verbandsgemeinden. The Verbandsgemeinde Klüsserath was dissolved in the course of the territorial reform carried out by the State of Rhineland-Palatinate in 1969/1970 and the local municipalities of Klüsserath, Leiwen, Köwerich, Detzem, Thörnich, Ensch, Schleich, Pölich and Bekond became part of the Verbandsgemeinde Schweich. The officially awarded additional designation "an der Römischen Weinstraße" has been used  since January 1, 1989. On January 1, 2012, the municipality of Trittenheim was incorporated. It was previously part of the Verbandsgemeinde Neumagen-Dhron in the Bernkastel-Wittlich district.

Population development

Politics

Verbandsgemeinderat 

The Verbandsgemeinderat Schweich consists of 36 honorary councillors, who were elected in the local elections on May 26, 2019 by personalized proportional representation, and the full-time mayor as chairwoman.

The distribution of seats in the municipal council:

(FWG = "Freie Wählergruppe der Verbandsgemeinde Schweich e.V.")

Mayor 
 Christiane Horsch, since 2012
 Berthold Biwer, 1996 to 2011
 Harald Bartos, 1985 to 1996 
 Bernhard Becker, 1963 to 1985
 Jakob Dedy, 1948 to 1963
 Johannes Grundmanns, 1945 to 1948
 Kurt Friedrich Keuchen, 1937 to 1945
 Hubert Ruland, 1925 to 1937
In the direct election on May 26, 2019, Horsch was confirmed in her office with a share of the vote of 81.3%.

Partnership 
The Verbandsgemeinde maintains partnerships with Portishead, England (since 1992), Murialdo, Italy (since 1995) and Krokowa in Poland (since 1995).

External links 

 Official website of the Verbandsgemeinde Schweich an der Römischen Weinstraße

References

Verbandsgemeinde in Rhineland-Palatinate